FC Kletsk is a Belarusian football club based in Kletsk, Minsk Oblast. The team plays in the Belarusian Second League.

History
FC Kletsk was founded in 2014, following the dissolution of their local predecessors Klechesk Kletsk in 2012. The club was eligible for promotion to the Belarusian First League for the 2017 season, but remained in the Second League after not meeting the licensing criteria.

Current squad
As of September 2022

References

External links
Profile at footballfacts.ru

 
Kletsk
2014 establishments in Belarus
Association football clubs established in 2014